Into the Morning is the third full-length studio album released by Ben Rector on his own label: Aptly Named Recordings.

Into the Morning peaked at No. 11 on the Billboard Top Heatseekers chart.

Track listing
 "The Beat" 3:37
 "Loving You is Easy" 3:09
 "When a Heart Breaks" 4:14
 "White Dress" 3:53
 "Out of My Head" 3:19
 "Autumn" 3:31
 "Moving Backwards" 3:10
 "When I Get There" 3:46
 "And Then You Love Someone" 3:52
 "Dance With Me Baby" 5:00

Charts

References

2010 albums
Ben Rector albums
Self-released albums